Angle brackets or chevrons in mathematical equations 〈〉 may refer to:
 Inner product
 Dirac notation (physics)
 Ordered pairs and other tuples in set theory (along with parentheses)
 Moment
 Linear span